Cationization of cotton is an electro kinetic phenomena ( zeta potential and electro kinetic) for surface charge of cotton. The cotton surface is charged with positive ions. Cationization alters the characterization of the surface of the cotton which allows salt free dyeing and improves the dye ability of cotton. The process involves the chemical reaction of cationic reactive agents with cellulose.

Etymology 
A cation (+) (/ˈkætˌaɪ.ən/), from the Greek word κάτω (káto), meaning "down", is an ion with fewer electrons than protons, giving it a positive charge. The suffixes for cationic groups discern between 'ylium' for cations created by the loss of a hydride ion and 'ium' for cations formed by addition of a Hydron.

Methods of cationization 
Cationization involves the modification of cellulosic macromolecules with positively charged sites with chemical reaction of cationic reactive agents for example with Quaternary ammonium cation or using (3-chloro-2-hydroxylpropyl) trimethyl-ammonium chloride (CHPTAC).

Advantages 

The industry has predominantly used reactive dyes to color knitted cotton goods. The treatment of salt-laden, colored effluent generated by the dyeing process is one of the industry's primary concerns. Cotton cationization is one of the most effective solutions to the aforementioned problem.

Cationization of cotton enables salt free dyeing and enhances the dyeability of the substrate with anionic dyes such as reactive dyes and direct dyes. Water and salt consumption are one of the major problems in the dyeing especially cotton which leads to substantial environmental impact with extra time and cost. Secondly washing off the residual salt is also important for washing fastness properties, which needs more washing baths. Cationization of cotton reduces the effluent, TDS load and water consumption in comparison to the conventional dyeing processes.

See also 
 Quaternary ammonium cation

References

External links 
 https://link.springer.com/article/10.1007/s10098-017-1425-y

Cotton
Textile chemistry
Properties of textiles